Broadbeach South light rail station is a major public transport hub in the Gold Coast suburb of Broadbeach. The station opened in July 2014 as the southern terminus of the G:link light rail line.

Surfside Buslines operate an extensive bus services from the station to the Gold Coast Airport, Tweed Heads, Robina station and Nerang station as well the surrounding suburbs. The G:link light rail service runs from the station to Helensvale via Southport and Surfers Paradise.

Location
Broadbeach South station is located on the corner of Hooker Boulevard and the Gold Coast Highway. The station provides direct access to Pacific Fair Shopping Centre and with the Broadbeach Surf Beach being only a few hundreds metres away.

Below is a map of local area surrounding the station.

Transport links 

Below is a list of public transport connections available from Broadbeach South.

References

External links

 Translink
 G:link

Bus stations in Gold Coast City
Broadbeach, Queensland
G:link stations
Transport infrastructure completed in 2014